Sharanabasappa Gouda Darshanapur, also known as Sharanabasappa Darshanapur (born 3 March 1961) is an Indian politician from Shahapur in Yadgir District, Karnataka. As of 2022, he is currently serving as the Member of Legislative Assembly of Karnataka from Shahapur constituency. He is a member of the Indian National Congress party.

Political Career 
Sharanabasappa Darshanapur has been elected from the Shahapur constituency for 4 terms in the 1994, 2004, 2008 and 2018 Karnataka State Legislative elections. After being elected for the first time as MLA from Shahapur (Karnataka), he became the minister of state for power in 1996 under J.H. Patel Cabinet. He served as the Cabinet Minister of Agricultural Marketing and Minister In-charge for undivided Gulbarga District from 18 February 2006 to 8 October 2007 in HD Kumaraswamy's First Cabinet. Alongside, in 2006 he was made the Incharge Minister for the undivided Gulbarga District (which then comprised today's Kalaburagi and Yadgir Districts and was one of the largest Districts in Karnataka). In 2018, he was appointed Deputy Chairman of the State Planning Board. On February 14, 2022 he was appointed the member of KKRDB Board along with 11 other MLAs belonging to the Hyderabad Karnataka Region.

Personal life 
Sharanabasappa Darshanapur completed his bachelor’s degree in Civil Engineering from PDA college of Engineering Kalaburagi. Before entering into politics, he worked as an Assistant engineer in Lift Irrigation Corp. Bijapur from 1985 to 1989. In 1992, he was elected as a senate member from Engineering Graduate Constituency Gulbarga University Gulbarga. In 1996, he became the founder member & President of Sir M Vishweshwaraiah sahakar Bank Niyamitha. In 1997, he became the founder and President of The Gulbarga Engineers' Family Club Gulbarga, he is currently the Chief patron of club.

He is married to Bharti Darshanapur and has one son and a daughter. His father Late Bapugouda Darshanapur was also an MLA of Shahapur for 3 terms. Late Bapu Gowda had also served as Minister for Small Scale Industries, Chief whip and Chairman of KHB.

Positions held

References 

Indian National Congress politicians from Karnataka
1961 births
Living people
Karnataka MLAs 1994–1999
Karnataka MLAs 2004–2007
Karnataka MLAs 2008–2013
Karnataka MLAs 2018–2023